Ain't Misbehavin is a 1955 musical film released by Universal-International and starring Rory Calhoun, Piper Laurie, Jack Carson and Mamie Van Doren. A young, rich-dreaming club girl falls in love with and marries the rich man of her dreams. As she begins to try to change herself to fit in with the ladies of rich society, her husband feels she is misbehaving with another man. In the end, they divorce and Sarah goes to a remote lodge. Kenneth meets her there and another argument ensues. Sarah then overhears Kenneth talking to Piermont about his love for Sarah just the way she is, and she leaves for the club, leaving instructions for the lodge master to tell Kenneth where she is. At the club, they get back together and fall in love all over again.

Plot

Cast
 Rory Calhoun as Kenneth Post
 Piper Laurie as Sarah Bernhardt Hatfield
 Jack Carson as Hal North
 Mamie Van Doren as Jackie
 Reginald Gardiner as Anatole Piermont Rogers
 Barbara Britton as Pat Beaton

See also
List of American films of 1955

References

External links
 
 

1955 films
1955 musical comedy films
1955 romantic comedy films
American musical comedy films
American romantic comedy films
American romantic musical films
1950s English-language films
Films directed by Edward Buzzell
Universal Pictures films
Films scored by Henry Mancini
1950s romantic musical films
1950s American films